Cane Creek Cascades is a  cascade located along Cane Creek, just above Cane Creek Falls.  The falls are located near Spencer, Tennessee in Fall Creek Falls State Park.

References

Waterfalls of Tennessee
Waterfalls of Van Buren County, Tennessee